Affleck Castle, also known as Auchenleck Castle, is a tall L-plan tower house dating from the 15th century,  north of Monifieth and  west of Monikie Parish Church, Angus, Scotland. It is a scheduled monument.
It is not open to the public.

History
The castle was built on the lands of the Auchenlecks of that Ilk held since 1471. From the mid-17th century it belonged to a family of Reids, who forfeited the castle in 1746 because of their activities as Jacobites.  It has not been occupied since 1760, when a new mansion was built.

Structure
Affleck Castle is a well-preserved free-standing rectangular tower of four storeys and a parapeted garret. A few steps down from the entrance is the basement, which is sub-divided.

The hall, which is on the first floor, has a vaulted ceiling; this supports a withdrawing room.  Above the main staircase is an entresol bedroom, almost  square, reached by an eleven-step staircase in the east wall.  The stairs lead from the hall.  The withdrawing room has a spy-hole into the hall below.  This would have allowed all movement to the main turnpike stair to be observed.  The room has window seats, wall closets, and a shafted fireplace. A step up from this room leads to a circular oratory, equipped with aumbry, piscine, holy-water stoup and stone candle-holders.  This room is also vaulted. There is a bedroom in each of the upper floors.

A projection by the door, with a square cap-house, houses the stair, and there is a square turret over the south-west angle.  There are two devices for dropping missiles or liquids on attackers: one over the arched door; and the other on the west front, while the ground floor is equipped with gun loops.

References

Castles in Angus, Scotland
Listed castles in Scotland
Scheduled Ancient Monuments in Angus
Tower houses in Scotland